Georg Schumann (born 17 August 1898, date of death unknown) was a German international footballer.

References

1898 births
Year of death missing
Association football forwards
German footballers
Germany international footballers